Lakehead is a census-designated place (CDP) in Shasta County, California. Lakehead is located halfway between Seattle and Los Angeles. Its population is 469 as of the 2020 census, up from 461 from the 2010 census.

Lakehead was established as a CDP for the 2010 census, replacing part of Lakehead-Lakeshore, California CDP.

History

In 2018, the western part of Lakehead was closed to the public due to the Carr Fire.

Geography
According to the United States Census Bureau, the CDP covers an area of 5.3 square miles (13.7 km2), 4.7 square miles (12.1 km2) of it is land, and 0.6 square miles (1.5 km2) of it (11.06%) is water.

Climate
According to the Köppen Climate Classification system, Lakehead has a warm-summer Mediterranean climate, abbreviated "Csa" on climate maps.

Demographics

The 2010 United States Census reported that 461 people, 228 households, and 134 families resided in the CDP. The racial makeup of the CDP was 91.3% White, 2.8% Native American, 0.4% Asian, 0.7% from other races, and 4.8% from two or more races. 2.4% of the population was Hispanic or Latino of any race.

The Census reported that 100% of the population lived in households.

There were 228 households, out of which 11.4% had children under the age of 18 living in them, 47.8% were opposite-sex married couples living together, 7.5% had a female householder with no husband present, and 3.5% had a male householder with no wife present. 4.4% of households were unmarried opposite-sex partnerships and 2.2% were same-sex married couples or partnerships. 32.0% of households were made up of individuals, and 14.0% had someone living alone who was 65 years of age or older. The average household size was 2.02. The average family size was 2.51.

The population was spread out, with 9.1% under the age of 18, 5.6% aged 18 to 24, 9.5% aged 25 to 44, 46.9% aged 45 to 64, and 28.9% who were 65 years of age or older. The median age was 57.7 years. For every 100 females, there were 114.4 males. For every 100 females age 18 and over, there were 111.6 males.

There were 347 housing units of which 80.3% were owner-occupied and 19.7% were occupied by renters. The homeowner vacancy rate was 5.6%; the rental vacancy rate was 13.0%. 75.3% of the population lived in owner-occupied housing units and 24.7% lived in rental housing units.

As of March 2019 there were over 700 registered voters in Lakehead.

Politics

References

Census-designated places in Shasta County, California
Census-designated places in California